State Highway 175 (SH 175) is a state highway in the U.S. state of Texas that runs from Montague to Nocona in Montague County.

Route description
The southern terminus of SH 175 is at an intersection with SH 59 and FM 1806 in the unincorporated community of Montague. The route heads north on a two-lane undivided road through rural areas before crossing into Nocona. In the city, SH 175 runs along Montague Street before reaching its northern terminus at US 82 in the center of the city.

History
The original route was designated on August 3, 1932 between Montague and St. Jo. On July 15, 1935, SH 175 was cancelled. On August 1, 1936, SH 175 had a location survey created on it. On September 22, 1936, SH 175 was restored. On September 26, 1939, SH 59 was rerouted over SH 175, and the old route of SH 59 was renumbered as new SH 175.

Major intersections

References

175
Transportation in Montague County, Texas